Makardah is a census town in Domjur CD Block of Howrah Sadar subdivision in Howrah district in the Indian state of West Bengal. It is a part of Kolkata Urban Agglomeration.

Geography
Saraswati River used to flow past the town.

Demographics
As per 2011 Census of India, Makardaha had a total population of 8,713 of which 4,428 (51%) were males and 4,285 (49%) were females. Population below 6 years was 756. The total number of literates in Makardaha was 7,048 (88.58% of the population over 6 years).

Makardaha was part of Kolkata Urban Agglomeration in 2011 census.

 India census, Makardaha had a population of 6,730. Males constitute 51% of the population and females 49%. Makardaha has an average literacy rate of 79%, higher than the national average of 59.5%: male literacy is 82% and female literacy is 75%. In Makardaha, 9% of the population is under 6 years of age.

Transport
Amta Road (part of State Highway 15) is the artery of the town. Makardaha-Mahiari Road also starts from here.

Bus

Private Bus
 63 Domjur - Howrah Station
 E44 Rampur - Howrah Station
 K11 Domjur - Rabindra Sadan

Mini Bus
 16 Domjur - Howrah Station
 31 Makardaha - Khidirpur
 34 Purash - Howrah Station
 35 Hantal - Howrah Station

CTC Bus
 C11 Domjur - B.B.D. Bagh/Belgachia
 C11/1 Munsirhat - Howrah Station

Bus Routes Without Numbers
 Bargachia - Sealdah Station (Barafkal)
 Pancharul - Howrah Station
 Udaynarayanpur - Howrah Station
 Rajbalhat - Howrah Station
 Tarakeswar - Howrah Station

Train
It is part of the Kolkata Suburban Railway railway system.

Culture

The temple of Makarchandi is the main attraction here. The original temple is believed to have been built by Srimanta Sadagar, who received the command of the goddess in a dream while sailing along the once mighty Saraswati River. Three pieces of stone lying in the present temple complex are believed to be the remains of the old temple. The present temple was built in  1821 (1743 Shakbada / 1228 Bangabda)  by Ramkanta Kundu Choudhury, zamindar of Mahiari as per the foundation stone of the temple. A fair is being organised on the occasion of local Panchamdol festival.

References

Cities and towns in Howrah district
Neighbourhoods in Kolkata
Kolkata Metropolitan Area